Argentine Venezuelans are Venezuelan citizens of partial or full Argentine descent, or Argentine citizens who have migrated to and settled in Venezuela. Many Argentines fled their country and settled in Venezuela during the military dictatorship that ruled Argentina from 1976 to 1983. In 2019, an estimate numbered Argentine Venezuelans still living in Venezuela at 9,740.

History
Argentine immigration to Venezuela had its peak during the 1970s. Many Argentines were fleeing the National Reorganization Process, the military dictatorship that ruled over Argentina from 1976 and 1983. The dictatorship persecuted leftists and other political opponents, and drove out middle-class professionals, causing a severe human capital flight. Other major periods of migration followed the economic crises suffered by Argentina during the 1980s and in 2001.

In recent years, due to the economic, social and political crisis in Venezuela, many Argentines and descendants of Argentines have chosen to return to their home country or to other, more stable countries, such as the United States.

Notable people
Argentine immigrants to Venezuela
Héctor Bidoglio – footballer
Alberto Garrido – journalist and writer
Fedra López – actress
Ricardo Montaner – musician and singer-songwriter
Rosalinda Serfaty – actress
Juana Sujo – actress
Hebe Vessuri – anthropologist

Venezuelans of Argentine descent
Mara Croatto – actress
Nahuel Ferraresi – footballer
Júnior Moreno – footballer
Mau y Ricky and Evaluna Montaner – musicians, children of Ricardo Montaner
Lilian Tintori – kitesurfer and activist
Elisa Trotta Gamus – human rights activist

See also
Venezuelan Argentines
Argentina–Venezuela relations
Immigration to Venezuela

References

Ethnic groups in Venezuela
Immigration to Venezuela
+